Joseph Sulaitis (June 20, 1921, in Hoboken, New Jersey – February 8, 1980, in Point Pleasant, New Jersey) was an American football running back  for the New York Giants of the NFL from 1943 to 1953. 

Sulaitis played high school football at William L. Dickinson High School in Jersey City, New Jersey.

References

1921 births
1980 deaths
William L. Dickinson High School alumni
American football running backs
New York Giants players
Boston Yanks players
players of American football from Jersey City, New Jersey